Great Council State Park in the Oldtown area of Xenia Township, Greene County, Ohio, United States, is scheduled to open in 2023.

In February 2021, the state of Ohio agreed to purchase a  site along U.S. Route 68, south of Brush Row Road, in Oldtown, north of Xenia, housing the Tecumseh Motel, for $260,000. The state planned to redevelop the property as a state park in honor of Tecumseh ( – October 5, 1813), the Shawnee leader who was killed in the War of 1812 and became an iconic folk hero in American, Indigenous, and Canadian history. The park would educate the public about Tecumseh and the Shawnee people, and its focal point would be a  interpretative center.

The park's location was chosen due to the Shawnee history in the area: Oldtown is on the former site of the large Shawnee settlement commonly referred to as Old Chillicothe, which had a population of 1000 between 1777 and 1780, and Old Chillicothe's council house is believed to have been located on a high ridge behind the motel; the park's location is also due to the earlier mistaken belief that Tecumseh had been born in Old Chillicothe. The park is to be developed by the Ohio Department of Natural Resources (ODNR) in coordination with the Ohio History Connection, the Eastern Shawnee Tribe of Oklahoma, the Shawnee Tribe and the Absentee Shawnee, and run by ODNR.

Ground was broken for the park on June 27, 2022. During the ceremony, it was announced that the interpretive center was now planned to be  and would include three floors of exhibits, a theater, a living stream, and a gallery. Displays will honor the history of the Shawnee people and allow present-day Shawnee to share their stories. Also highlighted will be historic settlers like Daniel Boone, who was held captive in Old Chillicothe for several months in 1778.

See also
 List of memorials to Tecumseh

References

External links

State parks of Ohio
Protected areas of Greene County, Ohio